Pathmini Sithamparanathan (born 26 July 1954) is a Sri Lankan Tamil politician and former Member of Parliament.

Early life
Sithamparanathan was born on 26 July 1954.

Career
Sithamparanathan was selected by the militant Liberation Tigers of Tamil Eelam (LTTE) to be one of the Tamil National Alliance's (TNA) candidates in Jaffna District at the 2004 parliamentary election. She was elected and entered Parliament. In March 2010 Sithamparanathan, along with fellow TNA MPs Gajendrakumar Ponnambalam and S. Kajendran, left the TNA and formed the Tamil National People's Front (TNPF).

Sithamparanathan contested the 2010 parliamentary election as one of the TNPF's candidates in Jaffna District but the TNPF failed to win any seats in Parliament. In February 2011 Sithamparanathan became one of the vice-presidents of the TNPF. She contested the 2015 parliamentary election as one of the TNPF's candidates in Jaffna District but again the TNPF failed to win any seats in Parliament.

Electoral history

References

1954 births
21st-century Sri Lankan women politicians
Living people
Members of the 13th Parliament of Sri Lanka
People from Northern Province, Sri Lanka
Sri Lankan Hindus
Sri Lankan Tamil politicians
Sri Lankan Tamil women
Tamil National Alliance politicians
Women legislators in Sri Lanka